Greg Jones (born 1989) is a former Australian professional tennis player.

Early life

Born in Sydney, Jones is an only child. He is the son of Russell Jones, a quantity surveyor, and Donna Jones, a teacher's aide. He competed in the Sydney GPS Schools tennis competition representing the Shore school, before eventually forgoing his school education to pursue his tennis career.

Jones competed in a number of high-profile events throughout his junior career including all four of the junior grand slams, most notably making the final of the 2007 French Open.

In 2007, Jones, having reached the finals of the junior event at the French Open, a semifinal at Wimbledon and a quarterfinal finish at the Australian Open, was very hopeful for a win at the last US Open Junior event, which was his last match in the International Tennis Federation Junior Competition.

Jones had a Junior career high ranking of 4 and won 191 out of 219 matches.

Professional career

Jones began playing professional tournaments in 2006. In his fourth ever professional event he made the final of the Burnie challenger in Tasmania, before spending time overseas in future events in an attempt to improve his ranking. Jones finished 2007 ranked 386, given his youth and ranking he was given wildcards into the 2008 Adelaide International qualifying draw, the 2008 Medibank International (which was his first ATP Tour main draw event)and the 2008 Australian Open qualifying draw. The highlight of 2008 for Jones was winning his first futures title in USA and he finished the year ranked 434.

2009 saw Jones compete in all the Australian ATP events again in January, but he was unable to qualify for any of the main draw in either Brisbane, Sydney or the Australian Open. Jones won his second future tournament of his career in April 2009 in Australia, before heading overseas to play in both Challengers and Futures tournaments, which was highlighted by a Challenger semifinal in Russia.

2010 started slowly for Jones, who once again was unable to qualify for Brisbane, Sydney or the Australian Open. In February he was able to make a second finals appearance at the challenger tournament in Burnie, going down to rising star Bernard Tomic in the final, Jones continued his good form with a finals showing in an Australian futures tournament two weeks later.
On 10 October 2010, Jones won silver for Australia in the Men's Tennis in the Commonwealth Games 2010 at Delhi, losing to India's Somdev Devvarman in the gold medal match played at the R.K. Khanna tennis stadium.

ATP Challenger and ITF Futures finals

Singles: 13 (3–10)

ATP Challenger and ITF Futures finals

Doubles: 12 (4–8)

Junior Grand Slam finals

Singles: 1 (1 runner-up)

Performance timeline

Singles

References

External links

Australian male tennis players
Sportsmen from New South Wales
Tennis players from Sydney
1989 births
Living people
Commonwealth Games silver medallists for Australia
Tennis players at the 2010 Commonwealth Games
Commonwealth Games medallists in tennis
Medallists at the 2010 Commonwealth Games